Michal Reichl (born 14 September 1992) is a Czech football player who plays for FC Hradec Králové.

References

External links
 
 

1992 births
Living people
Czech footballers
Czech Republic under-21 international footballers
Association football goalkeepers
SK Sigma Olomouc players
FK Dukla Prague players
Czech National Football League players
FC Hradec Králové players